Riwŏn or Iwon County is a county in South Hamgyŏng province, North Korea.  It is located at the province's northeastern tip and borders the Sea of Japan (Korea's "East Sea") to the southeast.

Name

"Riwŏn" is the official North Korean romanization of the county's name, using the McCune–Reischauer system. The breve is often omitted. It is named for its seat, Riwon. Due to the silting of the mouth of the Namdae, Riwon was located a little inland by the 1950s, with a larger port named Kunsŏn. The two communities have since merged under the name Riwon. The MR romanization used before the year 2000 was Iwŏn.

Physical features
Riwŏn is mountainous, although there are also small plains, and is home to the Taedŏk Mountains (대덕산맥).  The highest peak is Taedŏksan (1,442 m).  There are some 10 significant streams; the chief of these is the Namdaech'ŏn, which drains into the Sea of Japan.  There are various bays and islands along the coast. Thanks to its coastal location, the county enjoys a mild maritime climate.  Forestland (70% of which is coniferous) takes up 73% of the county's area.

Administrative divisions
Riwŏn county is divided into 1 ŭp (town), 3 rodongjagu (workers' districts) and 21 ri (villages):

Economy

Mining and manufacturing
Machine manufacturing dominates the local economy, accounting for half of annual industrial production. Deposits of iron, iron sulfide, talc, limestone, graphite, quartzite and silica are found in the county. The Riwon Mine produces talc.

Agriculture
Agriculture is carried out in the plains and along the streams; major crops include rice, soybeans and maize.

Transport
Riwŏn is served by roads, and by the P'yŏngra line of the Korean State Railway.

See also
Geography of North Korea
Administrative divisions of North Korea

References

External links

Counties of South Hamgyong